Tala al-Badru Alaynā is a traditional Islamic poem known as nasheed that the Ansar sang for the Islamic prophet Muhammad upon his arrival at Medina.

Many sources claim it was first sung as he sought refuge there after being forced to leave his hometown of Mecca. Some others, disagree by saying the second line reads "From the valley of Wada" (ﻣﻦ ﺛﻨﻴﺎﺕ ﺍﻟﻮﺩﺍﻉ). The valley of Wada was the place where people would walk with their loved ones who were travelling and say goodbye. It is located north of Medina and Mecca is south and Muhammad arrived at Quba which is south, so it is geographically impossible that it was sung at the Hijrah, some say.

The alternative opinion mainly put forth by Ibn Hajar al-Asqalani is that it was sung for Muhammad upon his arrival at Medina, to welcome him after completing the Battle of Tabuk.

Lyrics

Performances

Recorded versions
There have been many renditions of the song most notably by Mishary Rashid Alafasy, Oum Kalthoum, Sami Yusuf, Yusuf Islam, Mesut Kurtis, Native Deen, Raef, Maher Zain, Junaid Jamshed,  Marufur Rahman and others.

Other Performances
 It was used in the soundtrack of the 1976 film The Message, directed by Moustapha Akkad, and used in scene depicting Muhammad's hijra to Medina.
 It song by Olivia Newton-John as an interlude on her twenty-first album, Grace and Gratitude (2006).
 Little Mosque on the Prairie - Canadian sitcom - The song plays during the closing credits, performed by Maryem Tollar.
 It was used in a piano and symphony piece The Moonlight by Syrian German composer Malek Jandali
 An arrangement by Canadian composer, Laura Hawley, was sung at a holiday concert in Ottawa by a children's choir when Syrian refugees first began arriving in Canada in December 2015
 Maher Zain sampled the song in his song "Medina" in his 2016 album One.
 Marcus Viana, (A Brazilian composer) created an arrangement for the poem and used it in his 2003 Album "Poemas místicos do oriente"
 Omar Esa performed it in 2018 in the album My Muslim Family.
 It was sung in the fifth episode of first season of the Turkish series Diriliş: Ertuğrul.

See also

 Hijra
 Yathrib (Medina)

References

Islamic music
Muhammad in Medina
Arabic-language songs